Acheilognathus kyphus is a species of freshwater ray-finned fish in the genus Acheilognathus.  It is endemic to eastern Asia; inhabiting Thailand and northern Vietnam. However, due to a general lack of knowledge, IUCN has classified the fish as being data deficient. In Czech, Acheilognathus kyphus is known as "Hořavka thajská", meaning Thai bitterling.

References

Acheilognathus
Fish described in 1978